Franchester Martin Brennaman (born July 28, 1942) is an American retired sportscaster, best known for his long tenure as the play-by-play voice of Major League Baseball's Cincinnati Reds on the Cincinnati Reds Radio Network. Known for his opinionated, zealous, and sometimes contentious style, Brennaman called Reds games from 1974 to 2019.

Early life
A native of Portsmouth, Virginia, Brennaman attended Randolph-Macon College and the University of North Carolina, graduating from the latter institution with a communications degree in 1965. He began his broadcasting career at WGHP-TV in High Point, North Carolina, and followed with stints in Salisbury, North Carolina and Norfolk, Virginia. From 1970 to 1974 he called games for the Virginia Squires of the American Basketball Association.

In 1971, Brennaman began his career as a baseball radio announcer for the Tidewater Tides (now Norfolk Tides), the then-New York Mets' affiliate in the International League (Class AAA). 

In 1973, Virginia Tech athletic director Frank O. Moseley hired Brennaman as the new voice of the Hokies. Brennaman was the first Tech broadcaster to call both football and basketball, but he left VT in 1974 to become the broadcaster for the Cincinnati Reds.

Career
Brennaman joined Joe Nuxhall on the Reds radio team in 1974. "Marty and Joe" became an institution in the city, appearing together in numerous radio and television commercials. Brennaman's trademark call of a Reds victory ("And this one belongs to the Reds!") was coined during his second game with the team. This same phrase was expected to be placed in lights, outside of the Great American Ball Park in 2003, but Hamilton County officials nixed the idea, citing that the ballpark belongs to the taxpayers and not the team.<ref>{{cite news|url=http://www.enquirer.com/editions/2003/02/18/loc_redspark18.html|title=County balks on putting Brennaman's refrain on ballpark|last1=Erardi|first1=John|last2=Andrews|first2=Cindi|newspaper=The Cincinnati Enquirer|date=February 18, 2003|access-date=July 28, 2008|quote= The response from the county was, 'No, you can't put that up there. It doesn't belong to the Reds. It belongs to Hamilton County.'''}}</ref> Instead, only Nuxhall's signature signoff, "...Rounding third and heading for home." was used.

On January 16, 2019, Brennaman announced he would retire following the 2019 season. He broadcast his final Reds game on September 26, 2019.

Notable calls
Hank Aaron's record-tying 714th career home run in 1974 (Brennaman's first regular season game as a Reds announcer)
Tom Seaver's only no-hitter in 1978 when Seaver was a member of the Reds
Pete Rose's record-breaking 4,192nd career hit in 1985
Tom Browning's perfect game in 1988
Ken Griffey Jr.'s 500th career home run in 2004 and his 600th in 2008
The Reds' World Series victories in 1975, 1976, and 1990
Roy Halladay's no-hitter (second in postseason history) in game one of the 2010 NLDS between Cincinnati and Philadelphia.
 Jay Bruce's walk off home run to clinch the NL Central divisional title for the Reds in 2010.
Homer Bailey's no-hitters against the Pirates in 2012 and against the Giants in 2013.
Jake Arrieta's no-hitter against the Reds in 2016.

Accolades

In 2000, Marty Brennaman won the Ford C. Frick Award, presented annually by the National Baseball Hall of Fame to a broadcaster "for major contributions to the game of baseball"''.

The National Sportscasters and Sportswriters Association (NSSA) has named Brennaman as Ohio Sportscaster of the Year 12 times and Virginia Sportscaster of the Year four times, for his versatility in calling baseball, football, and basketball games on both the collegiate and professional levels. In addition to the Virginia Squires and the Norfolk Tides, he has called games for the Indiana Pacers, Virginia Tech, and William and Mary, as well as NCAA men's basketball tournament games.

In 1999, Brennaman was inducted into the Virginia Sports Hall of Fame. In 2005 Brennaman was inducted into both the NSSA Hall of Fame and the National Radio Hall of Fame.
On August 16, 2019, it was announced that Brennaman will be the only inductee to the Cincinnati Reds Hall Of Fame & Museum in 2020; the induction ceremony was scheduled to take place on April 26, 2020, but the ceremony eventually was pushed back to August 27, 2021 due to concerns related to the COVID-19 pandemic.

Controversies
In 1988, Brennaman and Nuxhall appeared before National League President A. Bartlett Giamatti at the NL office, in New York City in regards to accusations that Brennaman incited the crowd to cause a delay of game after an altercation between Reds manager Pete Rose and umpire Dave Pallone. After Rose was ejected from the game and Brennaman criticized Pallone during the live radio broadcast, fans littered the field with debris, leading to a game delay. Brennaman had this to say regarding the incident.
"I still maintain we were right", Brennaman said. "I'll never apologize for that. They accused us of inciting a riot. I don't think we did then and I don't think we did now."
On June 12, 2007, Brennaman made an on-air apology during the Cincinnati Reds Radio Network broadcast for a comment he had recently made comparing an upcoming road trip to the Bataan Death March. The Reds, who at the time held the worst record in the National League, were set to face the Oakland Athletics, the Seattle Mariners and Philadelphia Phillies on the road trip.

On April 17, 2008, during the top of the eighth inning of a game between the Chicago Cubs and the Cincinnati Reds at Wrigley Field in Chicago, Brennaman made comments about Cubs fans and the Cubs team. This occurred after then-Reds player Adam Dunn connected for a home run. Several baseballs, including the home run ball, were thrown onto the field, resulting in a game delay as the field crew recovered the debris. Said Brennaman:
"This is the kind of thing, quite honestly, right now, that makes you want to see the Chicago Cubs team lose. Among all baseball fans, and I can't attest to the Yankees or Red Sox, because we don't see them with any degree of regularity unless it's inter-league play, but far and away the most obnoxious fans in baseball, in this league, are those who follow this team right here. Throwing 15 or 18 balls onto the field, there's absolutely no excuse for that, and that is so typical of Chicago Cubs fans. It's unbelievable."
"You simply root against 'em. Y'know, I've said all winter they talked about this team winning the division, and my comment is they won't win it, because at the end of the day, they still are the Chicago Cubs, and they will figure out a way to screw this whole thing up."
On April 18, 2008, Brennaman appeared in an interview on Chicago sports radio station WMVP-AM 1000 in which he reinforced his position on Cubs fans, and compared Chicago Cubs fans to rival St. Louis Cardinals fans. "If they can't understand what happened Wednesday night was completely over the top, then I'm sorry", Brennaman said. "I said how tough it is to root for the Cubs. I think a lot of people feel the same way I do, but they won't articulate it. I'm not afraid to say what I think.""[Compared to Cubs fans] Cardinals fans are hands down the best in baseball. They respect the game. They don't go to the game to do stupid stuff.""The Cubs have some great baseball fans. But the ones who act like idiots (ruin) it for people like me."
On February 5, 2010, Brennaman was chastised for commenting that Marshall University's president must be "queer" for softball at the university's baseball banquet and fundraiser. Brennaman stated, "I probably could have made a better choice of words, but in no way does that reflect my opinion about gays at all. It's just a comment I made about the president of the university."

Personal life
Brennaman has three children. His son, Thom, and daughter, Dawn, are children from his first marriage. He also has a daughter, Ashley, from his second marriage. He has five grandchildren. He is married to Amanda Ingram. Thom, also a broadcaster, worked with the Reds, the Chicago Cubs, Arizona Diamondbacks, and was the number two baseball play-by-play man (behind Joe Buck) on Fox Sports' Major League Baseball broadcasts. On October 4, 2006, the Cincinnati Reds re-hired Thom to join his father in the radio booth as well as do play-by-play on television starting with the 2007 season..
After years of making good-natured fun of his longtime broadcast partner, the late Joe Nuxhall, for playing golf, Brennaman is now an avid golfer himself and speaks of the sport often during his broadcasts. The Marty Brennaman Golf Classic takes place annually at Belterra Casino.

References

External links
Marty Brennaman Calls Hank Aaron's 714th Home Run

Bibliography
Marty Brennaman Ford C. Frick Award biography at the National Baseball Hall of Fame

1942 births
Living people
American Basketball Association announcers
American radio sports announcers
Cincinnati Reds announcers
College basketball announcers in the United States
College football announcers
Ford C. Frick Award recipients
Indiana Pacers announcers
Journalists from Virginia
Major League Baseball broadcasters
Minor League Baseball broadcasters
National Basketball Association broadcasters
People from Portsmouth, Virginia
Radio personalities from Cincinnati
Randolph–Macon College alumni
UNC Hussman School of Journalism and Media alumni
Virginia Squires
Virginia Tech Hokies football announcers
Virginia Tech Hokies men's basketball announcers
Woodrow Wilson High School (Portsmouth, Virginia) alumni